A trident is a three-pronged staff.

Trident may also refer to:

Places

South Georgia 
The Trident, a mountain in South Georgia

United Kingdom
Trident, West Yorkshire, a civil parish and community in the City of Bradford

United States
Trident, Arkansas
Trident Technical College, a college in Charleston, South Carolina
Trident, Montana, a ghost town

Other
 Trident (crater), a crater in Taurus-Littrow valley on the Moon

Military
 Trident (missile), a submarine-launched ballistic missile used by the United States and the United Kingdom
 Trident (UK nuclear programme), based on the Trident missile
 French ship Trident (1811), a Téméraire-class ship of the French Navy
 HMS Trident (1768), a 64-gun third-rate ship of the line
 HMS Trident (1845),  a sloop built by Ditchburn & Mare
 HMS Trident (N52),  a T-class submarine built in 1937
 USS Trident (AMc-107), a World War II US Navy minesweeper
 SNCASO Trident, a French prototype interceptor aircraft
 Operation Trident (1971), the codename for an Indian Navy action during the Indo-Pakistani War
 Washington Conference (1943) or Trident, a strategic meeting between the United States and the United Kingdom during World War II

Computers
MSHTML (Trident), a browser engine in Internet Explorer
Trident Microsystems, a former graphics chip manufacturer
Project Trident, a desktop edition spin off of a TrueOS operating system

Comics
Trident Comics, a former publisher of British comic books
Trident (UK comics), an anthology comic book
Trident (DC Comics), a DC Comics character
Trident Corporation, a fictional corporation in Spriggan

Vehicles
Peel Trident, a British microcar made by the Peel Engineering Company
Trident Cars, a British sports car manufacturer
BSA Rocket 3/Triumph Trident, a 1960s/1970s British motorcycle made by Triumph Engineering, Meriden
Triumph Trident, a 1990s British motorcycle made by Triumph
Dennis Trident 2, a 2-axle bus model manufactured by Dennis Specialist Vehicles
Dennis Trident 3, a 3-axle bus model manufactured by Dennis Specialist Vehicles
Hawker Siddeley Trident, an aircraft designed by de Havilland
 Trident (spacecraft), a space mission concept to the outer planets proposed as a part of NASA's Discovery program

Music
Trident (McCoy Tyner album) (1975)
Trident (Kingfish album) (1978)
Trident Studios, a recording studio in Soho
Trident (label), a record label of The Trip
Trident (Japanese band), a band composed of Mai Fuchigami, Manami Numakura, and Hibiku Yamamura, based on TV anime series Arpeggio of Blue Steel

Other uses
Trident (spacecraft), proposed space mission to the outer planets as part of NASA's Discovery Program for launch in 2025/2026
Le Trident (theatre), Cherbourg, France
Trident (gum), a sugarless chewing gum manufactured by Mondelēz International Group
Operation Trident (1971), an offensive operation by the Indian Navy against the city of Karachi during the Indo-Pakistani War of 1971
Trident curve, an algebraic curve
Operation Trident (Metropolitan Police), a Metropolitan Police Service unit dealing with gun crime in London
Trident laser, a high-power short pulse laser facility at Los Alamos National Laboratory
Trident Racing, a motor racing team
Trident University International, an online school for higher education

See also
 HMS Trident, a list of ships of the Royal Navy
 Trident submarine (disambiguation), a common name for the British Vanguard-class and American Ohio-class Trident missile-armed submarines
 Trishula, a Hindu-Buddhist religious symbol, also the emblem of the Chakri Dynasty, the royal house of Thailand
 Tryzub, the coat of arms of Ukraine